State Highway 64 ( RJ SH 64) is a State Highway in Rajasthan state of India that connects Rohat in Pali district of Rajasthan with Ahore in Jalore district of Rajasthan. The total length of RJ SH 64 is 82 km. 

This highway connects NH 65 in Rohat to RJ SH 16 in Ahore. Other cities and towns on this highway are: Garwara, Vasi and Bhadrajun.

See also
 List of State Highways in Rajasthan
 Roads in Pali district

References
 State Highway

Pali district
Jalore district
State Highways in Rajasthan